Max Moffatt (born 27 June 1998) is a Canadian freestyle skier who competes internationally in the big air and slopestyle disciplines.

Career 
Moffatt joined the national team in 2014. In January 2019, Moffatt won his first World Cup medal, a gold, in the slopestyle event. In January 2022, Moffatt won the silver medal in the slopestyle at the 2022 Winter X Games.

On January 24, 2022, Moffatt was named to Canada's 2022 Olympic team in the big air and slopestyle events.

References

 

1998 births
Living people
Canadian male freestyle skiers
Sportspeople from Guelph
Freestyle skiers at the 2022 Winter Olympics
Olympic freestyle skiers of Canada